is a city on the island of Iki, in Nagasaki Prefecture, Japan. As of November 2022, the city has an estimated population of 25,042 and a population density of 202 persons per km2. The total area is 138.57 km2.

Geography
The city consists of five inhabited and 17 uninhabited islands, and its entire area is within the Iki-Tsushima Quasi-National Park.

Climate

History
The Iki Islands have been inhabited since the Japanese Paleolithic era, and numerous artifacts from the Jōmon, Yayoi and Kofun periods have been found. The islands were organized as Iki Province under the Ritsuryō reforms in the latter half of the seventh century. Following the establishment of the Tokugawa shogunate in the Edo period, the islands came under the rule of Hirado Domain.

Following the Meiji restoration, Iki became part of Nagasaki Prefecture, and was organized into Iki District and Ishida District, with a total of 22 villages. These were consolidated into 12 villages by 1889, and Ishida District was abolished in 1896. Mushozu was raised to town status in 1925, followed by Katsumoto in 1935 and Takawa in 1947. Gonoura was established in 1955, and Takawa was renamed Ashibe. Ishida was raised to town status in 1970.

The modern city of Iki was established on March 1, 2004, from the merger of the towns of Ashibe, Gonoura, Ishida and Katsumoto (all from Iki District).

Economy
The island has abundant groundwater reserves, and agriculture is widely practiced by the local inhabitants. Rice and tobacco are the primary cash crops. Commercial fishing and whaling, once the mainstay of the local economy, have been largely restricted since the 1980s, although sea urchin, sardine, mackerel, abalone and kombu are harvested. Tourism is a growing sector of the local economy.

Transportation

Iki Island has ferry terminals in Ashibe, Ishida and Gōnoura, which connect Iki to mainland Japan. Located on the east coast Iki Airport (IKI/RJDB) connects the island to Nagasaki. Japan National Route 382 connects the hamlets of the island together, and the bus company "Iki-kotsu" provides for public transport.

Sister cities
  Suwa, Nagano, since May 24, 1994

See also
 Iki Province

References

External links

 

Cities in Nagasaki Prefecture
Port settlements in Japan
Populated coastal places in Japan